Abell 2067 is a galaxy cluster in the constellation of Corona Borealis. On a larger scale, Abell 2067, along with Abell 2061, Abell 2065, Abell 2079, Abell 2089, and Abell 2092, make up the Corona Borealis Supercluster. Abell 2061 lies 1.8 megaparsecs south of it and the two are likely interacting.

References

Corona Borealis
2067
Galaxy clusters